Tawney is a surname that refers to:
C. H. Tawney (1837–1922), English educator and translator
Cyril Tawney (1930–2005), English singer and songwriter
James Albertus Tawney (1855–1919), American politician from Minnesota; U.S. representative 1893–1911
Lenore Tawney (1907–2007), American fiber artist
R. H. Tawney (1880–1962), English writer, economist, and historian

See also
Tawny (given name)